Taynan da Silva Rego (born 12 February 1993) is a Brazilian-born Kazakh professional futsal player who plays as a winger and pivot for ElPozo Murcia and the Kazakhstan national futsal team.

Honours
UEFA Futsal Champions League runner-up: 2018–19

References

External links
UEFA profile

1993 births
Living people
People from Campina Grande
Brazilian men's futsal players
Kazakhstani men's futsal players
Futsal forwards
Brazilian expatriate sportspeople in Iran
Brazilian expatriate sportspeople in Kazakhstan
Mes Sungun FSC players
Sporting CP futsal players
ElPozo Murcia FS players
Sportspeople from Paraíba